André de Mello Tavares de Mattos (born 8 October 1961) is a Brazilian actor. Most known for his roles as Fininho on the sitcom Escolinha do Professor Raimundo, John VI of Portugal on the minisseries O Quinto dos Infernos, and Madruga on the telenovela Senhora do Destino. In cinema, his most known role is Fortunato in Elite Squad: The Enemy Within, for which he won Grande Prêmio do Cinema Brasileiro for Best Supporting Actor.

He was born to Emílio and Zélia de Mattos, two theatre actors and one of the founders of Teatro O Tablado. André has already acted on over one hundred of plays as of 2010. He was married to Heloísa Périssé between 1988 and 1991, and was married to Roberta Repetto, with whom he has two daughters, from 1992 to 2013.

Selected filmography
 How Angels Are Born (1996)
 O Quinto dos Infernos (2002)
 Kubanacan (2003)
 Lisbela e o Prisioneiro (2003)
 Senhora do Destino (2004)
 Robots (2005; Brazilian dub)
 Caminhos do Coração (2008)
 The Mutants: Pathways of the Heart (2008)
 Elite Squad: The Enemy Within (2010)
 Balacobaco (2012)
 Odeio o Dia dos Namorados (2013)
 Narcos (2015)
 Belaventura (2017)

References

External links

1961 births
20th-century Brazilian male actors
21st-century Brazilian male actors
Brazilian male film actors
Brazilian male stage actors
Brazilian male television actors
Living people
Male actors from Rio de Janeiro (city)